Derby Makinka (born 5 September 1965, in Harare, Southern Rhodesia, died 27 April 1993) was a Zambian footballer and member of the national team. He was among those killed in the crash of the team plane in Gabon in 1993.

Career
Makinka played club football for Profound Warriors in Zambia, where he was voted Zambian Footballer of the year in 1989,  before moving to Pomir Dushanbe in the Soviet Top League near the end of 1989 after being spotted during their 4-0 win over Italy at the 1988 Olympics. With this move he became the first African, along with Pearson Mwanza and Wisdom Mumba Chansa, to play in the Soviet Union. Makinka's debut came on 2 October 1989 in an away match against Torpedo Moscow, before appearing twice more, against Rotor Volgograd and Metalist Kharkiv, before leaving at the conclusion of the 1989 season. Makinka went on to play for Darryn Textiles in Zimbabwe, Lech Poznań in Poland and Ettifaq FC in Saudi Arabia.

Personal life
Makinka had three children - one son and two daughters.

References

External links
 
 
 
 

1965 births
1993 deaths
Sportspeople from Harare
Zambian footballers
Zambian expatriate footballers
Zambia international footballers
Footballers at the 1988 Summer Olympics
Olympic footballers of Zambia
1990 African Cup of Nations players
1992 African Cup of Nations players
Victims of aviation accidents or incidents in Gabon
Expatriate footballers in the Soviet Union
Ettifaq FC players
Lech Poznań players
Expatriate footballers in Poland
Zambian expatriate sportspeople in Poland
CSKA Pamir Dushanbe players
Soviet Top League players
Saudi Professional League players
Expatriate footballers in Saudi Arabia
Zambian expatriate sportspeople in Saudi Arabia
Association football midfielders
Footballers killed in the 1993 Zambia national football team plane crash